Dirk Jansz Smient was governor of Mauritius in the new settlement at Grand Port from 1666 to 1669, when he returned to Cape of Good Hope. He was replaced by George Frederik Wreede. In November 1676 he led a punitive expedition from Cape Town to a group of Hottentots led by Chief Goenema, which failed as they could not be located.

References

Allister Macmillan, Mauritius illustrated: historical and descriptive, commercial and industrial facts, figures, and resources., London: W.H. & L. Collingridge, 1914

17th-century births
17th-century deaths
Dutch Governors of Mauritius